The Panocha Quartet is a Czech string quartet.

History
The Panocha Quartet was formed at the Prague Conservatory in 1968 from a trio consisting of Jiří Panocha (violin), Jaroslav Hlůže (viola), and Jaroslav Kulhan (cello). At the suggestion of their teacher, Josef Micka, they recruited violinist Pavel Zejfart to make up a quartet. In 1971 Hlůže was replaced on the viola by Miroslav Sehnoutka. 

In 1975 the ensemble won the Prague International String Quartet Competition and in 1976 they received the Bordeaux Gold Medal. They made their US début in 1975 and their German and Irish débuts the following year. In 1980 they toured Japan with the Smetana Quartet, whose members had been among their teachers. Since then they have enjoyed an international reputation. 

The quartet's repertory, founded on the Czech masters and the Viennese classics, includes the complete cycles by Dvořák and Martinů (both of which they have recorded) and a large number of quartets by Haydn, as well as many 20th-century works. They have collaborated on record and in concert with the pianists Rudolf Firkušný, Jan Panenka and András Schiff.

Quartet members
Jaroslav Kulhan (born 1950) studied cello at the Prague Academy of Music with Josef Chuchro. Jiří Panocha (born 1950) studied violin at the Prague Conservatory with Josef Micka, and at the Prague Academy of Music with Jiří Novák. Panocha plays a 1743 violin by Carlo Antonio Testore of Milan. Miroslav Sehnoutka (born 1952) studied viola at the Prague Academy of Music with Milan Škampa. Pavel Zejfart (born 1952) studied violin at the Prague Conservatory with Josef Micka and at the Prague Academy of Music with Nora Grumlíková.

References

External links 
Review in The New York Times (Tim Page)
Kusatsu Academy and Festival
Jiří Panocha - Profile at Academy of Performing Arts in Prague 

Czech string quartets